is a retired Japanese judoka.

Muramoto is from Nagasaki, Nagasaki and began judo at the age of 6. He belonged to Asahi Kasei after graduation from Tenri University in 1999.

Muramoto was good at Uchimata and Harai goshi.

In 2000, he won a gold medal at the Asian Championships held in Osaka, Japan. He was also participate All-Japan Championships 8 times. He was expected to get medal of Olympic Games or World Championships but could not participate by the trouble of the knee since 1995.

Muramoto retired in 2007. Now, he has coached judo at Osaka University of Health and Sport Sciences since 2009.

Achievements
1991 - All-Japan Junior high school Championships (+78 kg) 3rd
1993 - All-Japan high school Championships (+95 kg) 2nd
1994 - World Junior Championships (+95 kg) 3rd
 - All-Japan high school Championships (+95 kg) 1st
 - Inter-highschool championships (+95 kg) 1st
1995 - All-Japan University Championships (+95 kg) 3rd
1996 - World Junior Championships (+95 kg) 3rd
1997 - All-Japan Championships (Openweight only) 2nd
 - Kodokan Cup (+95 kg) 3rd
1998 - Paris Super World Cup (+100 kg) 3rd
 - All-Japan Selected Championships (+100 kg) 3rd
 - All-Japan University Championships (Openweigh) 1st
1999 - Pacific Rim Championships (+100 kg) 1st
 - Jigoro Kano Cup (+100 kg) 3rd
 - World Masters Munich (+100 kg) 3rd
2000 - Asian Championships (Openweight) 1st
 - All-Japan Selected Championships (+100 kg) 2nd
2001 - All-Japan Championships (Openweight only) 3rd
 - All-Japan Selected Championships (+100 kg) 2nd
2002 - Paris Super World Cup (+100 kg) 2nd
2003 - Jigoro Kano Cup (+100 kg) 3rd
 - All-Japan Selected Championships (+100 kg) 2nd
2005 - All-Japan Championships (Openweight only) 2nd

References 

Japanese male judoka
Sportspeople from Aichi Prefecture
1976 births
Living people
20th-century Japanese people
21st-century Japanese people